Katahari Gaupalika rural municipality, established in 2017, is a Gaupalika(rural municipality) located in the Morang District of the Kosi Zone in Province No. 1 of Nepal.

Geography
Katahari, Thalaha and Bhaudaha VDCs were incorporated into Katahari Gaupalika.

This rural municipality has an area of 51.59 km2. The population as of 2017 is 39,775.

The office of the Katahari Gaupalika rural municipality is in the town of Katahari, where the former Village development committee−VDC office was also.

References 

 
Rural municipalities of Nepal established in 2017
Rural municipalities in Koshi Province
Rural municipalities in Morang District